X Factor is a Danish television music competition to find new singing talent. The sixth season premiered on December 28, 2012 on DR1 and ended on March 22, 2013. Signe Molde replaced Lise Rønne as host, while Emil Thorup hosted new spin-off show Xtra Factor. Thomas Blachman returned for his fifth season as judge, while Ida Corr and Anne Linnet joined the judging panel as replacements for former judges, Pernille Rosendahl and Cutfather.

At the final on March 22 at Jyske Bank Boxen, Chresten, mentored by Corr, was announced as the winner.

Judges and hosts

After the sixth live show of the sixth season on March 15, 2013, Ida Corr was asked if she would return as a judge for another season and said that she did not know. On 17 June, it was reported that former judge Remee, who appeared in the first three seasons, was in talks with DR1 to return as a judge for season 7. On August 16, it was announced that Eva Harlou would replace Signe Molde as host for the seventh season. On 17 September, judge Anne Linnet revealed that Lina Rafn, who appeared in the first two seasons, and Remee would be re-joining Thomas Blachman for season 7.

Selection process

Bootcamp

The 6 eliminated acts were:
15-23s: Emil, Sarah
Over 24s: Dariana, Stine
Groups: Mette & Henrik, Nanna & Sofia

Contestants
 – Winner
 – Runner-up
 – Third place

Live shows

Results summary
Colour key

Contestants' colour key:
{|
|-
| – Blachman's contestants (15-23s)
|-
| – Corr's contestants (Over 24s)
|-
| – Linnet's contestants (Groups)

|}

Live show details

Week 1 (February 9)
Theme: Hope

Judges' votes to eliminate
 Corr: Lotus
 Linnet: Jonas
 Blachman: Lotus

Week 2 (February 15)
Theme: Against

Judges' votes to eliminate
 Corr: Zaina
 Blachman: Jonas
 Linnet: Zaina

Week 3 (February 22)
Theme: Power

Judges' votes to eliminate
 Blachman: Jonas
 Linnet decided to let Corr decide between her two acts
 Corr: Jonas

Week 4 (March 1)
Theme: DR Bigband

Judges' votes to eliminate
 Blachman: Wasteland
 Corr: Anna & Lusanda
 Linnet: Anna & Lusanda

Week 5 (March 8)
Theme: Danish hits
Guest mentors: Remee and Cutfather
Musical Guests: Panamah ("Børn af Natten") & Rasmus Walter ("Endeløst")
Group performances: "Mine øjne de skal se" / "Jeg vil ha' dig for mig selv" / "Jeg tager imod" / "Den jeg elsker" / "Midt om natten"

Week 6: Semi-final (March 15)
 Theme: Viewers choice; Judges choice
 Musical Guest: Ida ("Underdog")

The semi-final did not feature a final showdown and instead the act with the fewest public votes, Amanda, was automatically eliminated.

Week 7: Final (March 22)

References

Season 06
2012 Danish television seasons
2013 Danish television seasons